Tolentino Murillo (born 29 August 1967) is a Colombian weightlifter. He competed in the men's featherweight event at the 1988 Summer Olympics.

References

External links
 

1967 births
Living people
Colombian male weightlifters
Olympic weightlifters of Colombia
Weightlifters at the 1988 Summer Olympics
Place of birth missing (living people)
Pan American Games medalists in weightlifting
Pan American Games silver medalists for Colombia
Weightlifters at the 1987 Pan American Games
20th-century Colombian people
21st-century Colombian people